Ronald Clifton Bolton (born April 16, 1950, in Petersburg, Virginia) is a former National Football League defensive back and current college football coach. He is an alumnus of Norfolk State University, where he played college football. Bolton played from 1972 to 1975
for the New England Patriots and played from 1976 to 1982 for the Cleveland Browns.

During his coaching career, he served as an assistant coach at Norfolk State University, Delaware State University and Liberty University. Bolton is currently a defensive backs
coach at Howard University.

References

External links
 Player profile at clevelandbrowns.com

American football cornerbacks
New England Patriots players
Cleveland Browns players
Norfolk State Spartans football players
Players of American football from Virginia
Living people
1950 births